The Boyacá spiny rat (Proechimys chrysaeolus) is a species of rodent in the family Echimyidae. It is endemic to Colombia; it is found primary forest in Carare River valley, Boyacá Department, 100 to 500 meters above sea level. Nocturnal, terrestrial and solitary, it feeds on seeds, fruit and some leaves and insects. It is threatened by habitat loss for mining and agriculture.

Phylogeny
Morphological characters and mitochondrial cytochrome b DNA sequences showed that P. chrysaeolus belongs to the so-called trinitatus group of Proechimys species, and shares closer phylogenetic affinities with the other members of this clade: P. trinitatus, P. mincae, P. guairae, P. poliopus, P. magdalenae, P. urichi, and P. hoplomyoides.

References

Proechimys
Endemic fauna of Colombia
Mammals of Colombia
Mammals described in 1898
Taxa named by Oldfield Thomas
Taxonomy articles created by Polbot